Blag may refer to:

Entertainment
Sweeney 2: The Blag, a 1978 novel by Joe Balham, aka Alan White
Blag, a 2004 novel by Tony Saint
Blag, a 1982 song by Smile off the album Gettin' Smile written by Brian May, see Brian May discography

Fictional characters
Big Blag, a character from the videogame series Battletoads
Mr. Blag, a character from The Thick of It
Blag, a wildebeest and Kazar's former henchman from the 2006 Disney animated film The Wild
Blag, a character from the UK TV sitcom Chelmsford 123

Linguistics
A British term, meaning to obtain confidential information by impersonation or other deception; see Glossary of British terms not widely used in the United States
A Philippine onomatopoeia for a falling strike; see Cross-linguistic onomatopoeias

Other uses
Blag Dahlia (born May 8, 1966), front-man of the punk rock band Dwarves
BLAG Linux and GNU, an operating system produced by the Brixton Linux Action Group
Bipartisan Legal Advisory Group (BLAG), an arm of the U.S. House of Representatives
Blagoveshchensky District, Altai Krai, Russia

See also

Blog, a truncation of the expression web log